Bertie Beaver is the forest fire prevention character symbol of the Alberta Forest Service, similar in purpose to Smokey Bear.

"By the mid-1950s, Eric S. Huestis, Alberta's Forestry Director and Game Commissioner, strongly felt that Alberta should have its own distinct image to deliver fire prevention messages to the public. Walt Disney agreed, and set his staff to work preparing sample images for fire poster designs".  He was created by Walt Disney Studios in 1958.

References

External links
Bertie Beaver Activity Book
Bertie Activity book:  https://open.alberta.ca/publications/0778540561

Fictional beavers
Fire prevention
Rodent mascots
Public service announcement characters
Male characters in advertising
Disney animated characters
Provincial symbols of Alberta
Mascots introduced in 1958